Instructional animations are animations that are used either to provide instructions for immediate performance of a task or to support more permanent learning of subject matter. While both of these uses can be described as instructional animations, when the goal is to support learning, the term educational animation may be preferred.

Educational materials
Educational technology
Animation